Kamenná Horka is a municipality and village in Svitavy District in the Pardubice Region of the Czech Republic. It has about 300 inhabitants.

Geography
It lies in the Svitavy Uplands.

References

Villages in Svitavy District